Mandy Edwards (born 28 July 1982) is an Australian netball player. In 2008, Edwards was signed to play in the ANZ Championship for the Adelaide Thunderbirds. Edwards was educated at Westminster School in Adelaide.

References
2008 Adelaide Thunderbirds profile.

1982 births
Living people
Australian netball players
Adelaide Thunderbirds players
ANZ Championship players
Netball players from South Australia
People educated at Westminster School, Adelaide
AIS Canberra Darters players